Michael D. Akers (born September 5, 1970 in Ephrata, Pennsylvania) is an American film director, producer, screenwriter and editor. In 2000, he founded "United Gay Network" (UGN) with his longtime partner, Sandon Berg. Most of his films are LGBT-related.

Career
Michael D. Akers studied at Indiana University of Pennsylvania before moving to Los Angeles to begin a career in the entertainment industry as production assistant and assistant director to work on the cable movie Jurassic Women (1996). For three years, he worked with Turner Feature Animation on Cats Don't Dance helping to research and develop animated features. Then he moved to Grand Productions, and later produced at least two episodes of the Lifetime series Intimate Portraits. These included the "Intimate Portraits" of Heather Locklear and Jane Seymour. He became executive assistant to Martin Short on The Martin Short Show and a story and research assistant to Ryan Seacrest's NBC's Saturday Night at the Movies and Anne Robinson's The Weakest Link.

Establishing United Gay Network, he moved to independent film making. In March 2002, Michael D. Akers directing his short B&W w/Splash of Clown in partnership with Sandon Berg. His debut long feature film Gone But Not Forgotten, a script he had begun writing back in 1995 while working for another film production company, premiered at the 9th Annual Philadelphia International Gay and Lesbian Film Festival. It was followed by Matrimonium, an improv film about a reality show trying to marry two men for ratings. Phoenix is a symbolic and lyrical film examining why relationships end the way that they do. It focuses on a young man who goes to Phoenix, Arizona to surprise his lover, only to discover his lover's secret other life. Morgan is about a paraplegic man putting his life back together after a bicycle racing accident leaves his paralyzed.

In Gone, But Not Forgotten he was credited as Michael D. Akers. But in all later movies, he used Michael Akers (dropping the middle "D").

United Gay Network
United Gay Network is a production house founded by Michael D. Akers and Sandon Berg. Akers has released his films through the company.

In forming United Gay Network ten years ago, Michael Akers and Sandon Berg aspired not only to promote the genre of "gay films" but also tried to bring gay cinema closer to mainstream cinema. As Berg stated in a radio interview, he and Akers were striving to create stories that would crossover to a broader audience.

Nowhere is this more apparent than in their latest production Morgan. Berg said: "I think Morgan is a very universal story. I don't think it is gay-specific at all." Morgan is the story of a gay and paralyzed young athlete that defies stereotypes and pushes through boundaries. The lead character, a young athlete, named Morgan Oliver, is first seen wallowing in a state of depression, drowning his sorrows in beer as he watches bicycle racing (the sport that at once defined his sense of purpose and drove him to his catalytic accident) on television.

 UGN's first long feature film, [[Gone, But Not Forgotten (film)|Gone, But Not Forgotten]],was  considered ground breaking and to have set the pace for normalizing the portrayal of gay people in cinema.

Each successive film produced by UGN has increasingly pushed limits and expanded the range of Akers and Berg as filmmakers.  With each film, Akers and Berg shook things up. Matrimonium was a foray into comedy that played to reality show hype, while addressing homosexual stereotypes, and Phoenix was yet another step, into the suspenseful and mysterious journey of two jilted lovers following the trail of their mutual betrayer.

Personal life
Akers is openly gay. His long-term partner is Sandon Berg. They have been together since the late 1990s.

Filmography

Director
2003: Gone, But Not Forgotten2005: Matrimonium2006: Phoenix2012: MorganOthers
2011: The Friends Project of David Raleigh with Alan Cumming, Ari Gold, and Billy Porter to benefit the Ali Forney Center

Producer
2003: Gone, But Not Forgotten2005: Matrimonium2012: MorganWriter
2003: Gone, But Not Forgotten2005: Matrimonium2006: Phoenix2012: MorganEditor
2003: Gone, But Not Forgotten2005: Matrimonium2005: Flirting with Anthony2006: Phoenix2006: Love Life2010: Going Maverick: The Sarah Palin Story (video short)
2011: The Friends Project of David Raleigh with Alan Cumming, Ari Gold, and Billy Porter to benefit the Ali Forney Center
2012: Morgan''

References

External links
Official resume
United Gay Network Official website
Michael Akers YouTube

Vimeo

1970 births
21st-century American male writers
American Buddhists
American film editors
Film producers from Pennsylvania
American male screenwriters
Film directors from Pennsylvania
American gay writers
LGBT Buddhists
LGBT film directors
LGBT people from Pennsylvania
Living people
People from Ephrata, Pennsylvania
20th-century American male writers
Screenwriters from Pennsylvania